William Voyles (also Voiles, Vowells) (1741 – January 1798) was an American Revolutionary War soldier who enlisted in the 6th North Carolina Regiment of the North Carolina Line on the same day as the adoption of the Declaration of Independence, July 4, 1776.  (The document, written by Thomas Jefferson, was actually signed on August 2, 1776.)  Voyles fought with the 6th North Carolina Regiment, and reenlisted in 1779 in the 1st North Carolina Regiment.

Revolutionary War Service
Service record:
 William Vowell (sic), 6th North Carolina Regiment, 1776; 5/1/1776, a Private under Lt./Capt. Thomas White for three years.  
 9/8/1778, a known Private under Capt. John Sumner (1st North Carolina Regiment).  
 3/12/1779, re-enlisted for the duration of the war in the same unit.

Voyles served under the command of General Francis Marion (known to his contemporaries as the "Swamp Fox"), as well as General Nathanael Greene and Major General Horatio Gates.  He was captured by the British during the Battle of Camden, but was able to escape.  He later fought in the Battle of Kings Mountain, and the Battle of Cowpens (the turning point for the Patriots in the Southern Campaign of the war).

He was paid nine pounds, four shillings in May 1782 for military service; and in May 1783, he was paid nine pounds, two shillings.

Early life
Originally from Pembrokeshire, Wales, Voyles came to America circa 1755 with his father, Jacob, brother Thomas, and the twins, John and James.

Indentured servitude
Like many "Welsh Kale," William became an indentured servant (or 'bonded laborer') to a ship's captain for four years. Often, when the ship was docked in Wales, Voyles would spend his time with his uncle, David, who he eventually convinced to immigrate back to the Colonies with him. After returning to America, Voyles settled in North Carolina instead of South Carolina, where his father lived.

Family and farm life
Voyles became a cotton farmer. In 1772, he married Italian immigrant Hanna Rhodecia Bundi (1748–1807). Together they raised 14 children: William, Rachel, Roland "Rolin", Andrew (died at 2 months), Thomas, Abel, David, Moses, Daniel, Joseph, James, John, Hannah and Mary.

Land Grants
He and the other militiamen would often return home to their farms until called upon to fight again. As was custom for the new government, these militia were often paid for their service in grants of land. Although not officially granted until August 1787 (after the close of the war) the family took up residence at the site almost immediately. On May 22, 1794, he entered the second grant for another  tract.

Death
William died at his home in what is now Cabarrus County in North Carolina and was buried in the family burial ground on the old farm. His wife Hanna was later buried alongside him.

References

Daughters of the American Revolution, Washington, D.C., Ancestor Number A119122, William Voiles
Records of the Revolutionary War, collections of the North Carolina Historical Commissions army Account's Volume No. 5 Book of Certificates.
Line of decent-Bible records, History of Lawrence, Orange and Washington Counties, Indiana (1884) p. 878
State of North Carolina, Salisbury District, No. 1514
 Questions on NCPedia, Link

1741 births
1798 deaths
People from Pembrokeshire
Continental Army soldiers from North Carolina
English emigrants
People of colonial North Carolina
Burials in North Carolina
American people of Welsh descent
People from Cabarrus County, North Carolina
Military personnel from Pembrokeshire